The Indian Refining Company was an American oil company in operation from the first decade of the 1900s to April 2, 1943. It was bought by the Texas Company in 1931. It had an oil refinery based in Lawrenceville, Illinois.  Indian Refining patented the first "wax free" oil under the Havoline brand. The chemists at the Lawrenceville, Illinois refinery developed the wax free motor oil which led to an Indian Refining patent. The Texas Company (TEXACO) acquired Indian Refining in 1931 primarily to access the formulation for wax free motor oil, which was developed and is currently the standard for all conventional motor oils throughout the world.

Publications
 Heavy liquid asphalt binder for road construction, liquid asphalt, road preserver and dust eliminator, 1909
 Inspection of refinery, Georgetown, Ky., by members of The National Petroleum Association, Independent Petroleum Marketers' Association, and by the governor and state officials of Kentucky, 1910
 The old costly method, the economical modern method, 1910
 Havoline tours, book 15, California, 1911
 Annual statement (date unknown)

References

External links
 https://web.archive.org/web/20091027033300/http://geocities.com/indianrefining1931/
 http://www.oldgas.com/info/texacohist.html

Defunct oil companies of the United States
Texaco